Coast Guard is a 1939 American adventure film released by Columbia Pictures, directed by Edward Ludwig and starring Randolph Scott, Frances Dee and Ralph Bellamy.  It is set before World War II.

The Hollywood Reporter indicated that Frances Dee replaced Gene Tierney in the role of Nancy Bliss. Coast Guard was the first film of actor Michael Gale, who changed his name in 1941 to Craig Stevens.

Plot
Lieutenant Raymond "Ray" Dower commands a United States Coast Guard cutter. His best friend in the Coast Guard, Lieutenant Thomas "Speed" Bradshaw, is a highly regarded, but reckless pilot. In a daring rescue at sea, both men are involved in saving Tobias Bliss, the captain of a tramp steamer. At the base hospital, the two officers visit the rescued man and meet Nancy, his granddaughter. Both friends fall in love with her, but Speed proposes first; broken-hearted, Ray still acts as the best man at the wedding.

The marriage falters, and when Nancy is fed up with many nights alone, she leaves Speed. In trying to win her back, Speed crashes while stunting over her house. Grounded and facing a court-martial, the disgraced pilot finds out that his best friend is missing while on an Arctic rescue mission. Nancy coaxes Speed and his co-pilot, O'Hara, to attempt a rescue, and after a harrowing crash-landing in the Arctic, an injured Ray is located. Speed manages a dangerous takeoff and flies his friend back home, to find a relieved Nancy waiting for him.

Cast
As credited, with screen roles identified:

 Randolph Scott as Lieutenant Thomas "Speed" Bradshaw
 Frances Dee as Nancy Bliss  
 Ralph Bellamy as Lieutenant Raymond "Ray" Dower
 Walter Connolly as Tobias Bliss
 Warren Hymer as O'Hara 
 Robert Middlemass as Captain Lyons
 Stanley Andrews as Commander Hooker
 Edmund MacDonald as Lieutenant Thompson
 Lester Dorr as Second Officer (uncredited)

Production

Coast Guard was a period B film actioner, combining exciting coast guard rescues with a typical romantic sub-plot: "friends in love with girl, girl picks cad, romance in trouble, all is right in the end". An array of stock footage and model work is mixed in with live action. As one of the many serials, features and shorts that was based on the  United States Coast Guard, the "B" feature was notable in that it featured a trio of rising stars, Randolph Scott, Ralph Bellamy (in another one of his "buddy" roles as the steady and dependable friend) and Frances Dee. Principal photography took place at the Columbia Studios and on location along the California coastline from April 26–June 16, 1939. Coast Guard highlighted the state-of-the-art rescue equipment used by the USCG, including the Douglas Dolphin seaplane.

Reception
Leonard Maltin, in a later review, commented, "Routine but action-filled hokum with similarities to Capra's Dirigible."

References

Notes

Citations

Bibliography

 Bowers, Peter M. "Douglas Dolphin." Airpower, Volume 12, Number 6, November 1982.
 Carlson, Mark. Flying on Film: A Century of Aviation in the Movies, 1912–2012. Duncan, Oklahoma: BearManor Media, 2012. .
 Francillon, René J. McDonnell Douglas Aircraft since 1920, Volume 1. London: Putnam & Company Ltd., Second revised edition, 1988, 1979. .
 Sims, Don. "U.S.C.G. Aviation ... A History." Air Classics Quarterly Review, Volume 3, No. 2, Summer 1976.
 Wainwright, Marshall. "Dolphin from Douglas: Part Two." Air Classics, Volume 47, No. 5, May 2011.

External links
 
 
 

1939 films
American romantic drama films
American aviation films
Columbia Pictures films
1930s English-language films
American black-and-white films
1939 romantic drama films
American adventure drama films
1939 adventure films
Films about the United States Coast Guard
Films with screenplays by Richard Maibaum
1930s American films